St. Joseph's Senior Secondary School is a school in Dibiyapur, a town in the district of Auraiya, Uttar Pradesh, India. It is a Catholic Christian educational institution run by the St. Thomas Educational and Medical Society.

History

In 1986 when St. Joseph's Church, NTPC, Dibiyapur originated, the dream of late Rev. Fr. Issac Kochupura was fulfilled. During those initial days of the Power Plant he used to visit the Christian families at Dibiyapur and offer Holy Mass for them in the NTPC colony. As per their request it was decided to open a School for the Company employees children which was inaugurated by Rt. Rev. Dr Cecil De Sa the Archbishop of Agra on 15 July 1989. 

The school is located inside the township of NTPC's Auraiya Gas Power Station, Alok Nagar, Dibiyapur. This school was established in 1989 having a very small number of students ( 31 students ) and few teachers run in two CISF quarters at NTPC Township. The NTPC Recreation Centre also worked as the school building during the early days of this school. But the proper building was constructed in 2006 when the number of students in the school grew due to students interested in taking admission from outside the township, that is, from the town Dibiyapur and from the district Auraiya.

Description

This co-educational institution is managed by St. Thomas Educational and Medical Society, Etawah and affiliated to CBSE, Delhi. Today this school has about 1400 students and a 50 teaching and non-teaching staff. The school is from kindergarten to 12th class (CBSE) with  streams of Science & Commerce available for its students of senior secondary grade. Most of the teachers are Keralaites including some nuns except for Hindi and Sanskrit teachers. The present manager of the school is Rev. Father James Palackal and principal is Rev. Sister Rosmy.

The school has its nearest branch at the NTPC GAIL ROAD Dibiyapur.  This is an elementary school of pre-nursery to 3rd class students. It was started in July 2011. Another mission (ST.FRANCIS ACADEMY)has recently come up at Auraiya in 2006.

School is continuously giving good results in 10 & 12 board examination. School has the record for getting good grades from students. Last year the highest percentage of class 10 was 98%.

Catholic secondary schools in India
Primary schools in Uttar Pradesh
High schools and secondary schools in Uttar Pradesh
Christian schools in Uttar Pradesh
Dibiyapur
Educational institutions established in 1989
1989 establishments in Uttar Pradesh